Diplura lineata is a species of funnel-web tarantulas belonging to the subfamily Diplurinae. This species can be found in Venezuela and Brazil.

References

 Bertkau, 1880 : Verzeichniss der von Prof. Ed. van Beneden auf seiner im Auftrage der Belgischen Regierung unternommen wissenschaftlichen Reise nach Brasilien und La Plata im Jahren 1872-73 gensammelten Arachniden. Mémoires couronnés et mémoires des savants étrangers / publiés par l'Académie royale des sciences, des lettres et des beaux-arts de Belgique, vol. 43, p. 1-120.

Dipluridae
Spiders of South America
Spiders described in 1857